The following lists events that happened during 1839 in Australia.

Events
3 January - John Hutt becomes Governor of Western Australia
15 January - The first US consul, J. H. Williams, takes residence in Sydney
6 February - The Port Phillip Patriot and Melbourne Advertiser are published for the first time by John Pascoe Fawkner
16 February - Kiama is proclaimed a town
19 March - Settlement begins at Port Lincoln
3 April - William Light is replaced by Charles Sturt as Surveyor-General of South Australia
13 April - Albury is proclaimed a village
24 April - Braidwood is proclaimed a town
1 May - Edward John Eyre explores the area north of Adelaide until 29 June, during the expedition he discovers Lake Torrens
20 June - A settlement is founded at Victor Harbor
27 July - The Adelaide River is discovered
9 September - Port Darwin is named by John Lort Stokes on

Exploration and settlement
Edward John Eyre explores areas to the far north and west of Adelaide during his two expeditions.

Settlements
Alberton, South Australia
Albury, New South Wales
Balhannah, South Australia
Blakiston, South Australia
Brunswick East, Victoria
Burnside, South Australia
Carcoar, New South Wales
Findon, South Australia
Gumeracha, South Australia
Hahndorf, South Australia
Hope Valley, South Australia
Mandurama, New South Wales
Mount Barker, South Australia
Nairne, South Australia
Penwortham, South Australia
Seymour, Victoria
St Kilda, Victoria
Strathalbyn, South Australia
Tusmore, South Australia

Arts and literature
First mechanics' institute was founded at Melbourne

Births
 14 March – George Adams, publican and lottery promoter (born in the United Kingdom) (d. 1904) 
 18 April – Henry Kendall, author and bush poet (d. 1882)
 30 April – Sir Francis Suttor, New South Wales politician and pastoralist (d. 1915)
 10 May – Thomas Joseph Carr, Catholic archbishop (born in Ireland) (d. 1917)
 29 May – Ned Gregory, cricketer (d. 1899)
 19 June – Howard Willoughby, journalist and war correspondent (born in the United Kingdom) (d. 1908)
 1 July – William George Lawes, minister, missionary and public lecturer (born in the United Kingdom) (d. 1907)
 2 September – Elias Solomon, Western Australian politician (born in the United Kingdom) (d. 1909)
 9 December – Norman Selfe, civil engineer (born in the United Kingdom) (d. 1911)
 19 December – Charles Dempster, Western Australian politician and explorer (d. 1907)
 Unknown – George Rignold, actor (born in the United Kingdom) (d. 1912)

Deaths
 6 May – John Batman, explorer, grazier and entrepreneur (b. 1801)
 27 June – Allan Cunningham (botanist), botanist and explorer (born in the United Kingdom) (b. 1791)
 24 July – Sir Richard Spencer, naval officer and settler (born in the United Kingdom) (b. 1779)
 6 October – William Light, military officer and surveyor (born in Malaysia) (b. 1786)
 9 October – James Oatley, watchmaker and convict (born in the United Kingdom) (b. 1769)

References

 
Australia
Years of the 19th century in Australia